One Grain of Sand is an album by American folk singer Odetta, first released in 1963. It was re-released on CD in 1997.

Track listing
All songs Traditional unless otherwise noted.
"Sail Away, Ladies" – 2:41
"Moses, Moses" (John Davis, Alan Lomax) – 3:00
"Midnight Special" – 3:26
"Rambler-Gambler" – 3:22
"Cotton Fields" (Lead Belly) – 3:25
"Roll On, Buddy" – 3:04
"Ain't No Grave" – 2:24
"Special Delivery Blues" – 2:41
"Rambling Round Your City" (Woody Guthrie) – 4:06
"Boll Weevil" – 2:18
"Come All Ye Fair and Tender Ladies" – 3:28
"She Moved Through the Fair" –  3:05
"Cool Water" (Bob Nolan) – 3:08
"One Grain of Sand" (Pete Seeger) – 2:09

Personnel
Odetta – vocals, guitar
Bill Lee – bass

Production notes
Design by Jules Halfant
Photography by Pompeo Posar

References

1963 albums
Odetta albums
Vanguard Records albums